Amar Singh or Ramaswami Amarasimha Bhonsle (Marathi: रामस्वामी अमरसिंह भोसले) was the younger son of the Maratha Raja of Thanjavur Pratap Singh and served as the regent soon after the death of his brother Thuljaji II and ruled Thanjavur in the name of Thuljaji's minor son Serfoji II from 1787 to 1793.

Reign
In 1793, he usurped the throne after deposing the boy-King Serfoji and ruled as the absolute ruler of Thanjavur from 1793 to 1798.

He is said to have been very generous and to have given vast amounts of land to learned men. He resisted attempts by the British to seize the kingdom right until the time of his deposition in favour of his adoptive nephew, 29 June 1798.

He showed interest in Telugu and Sanskrit dramas. Mathru Boothana was a famous poet in his court and he composed Parijatapaharanam, which bears similarity to Kuchupudi Dance.

See also
Thanjavur Maratha kingdom

Maharajas of Thanjavur
Marathi people
1802 deaths
Year of birth missing